Clarence Albert Short (July 1, 1873 – March 23, 1947) was an American college football and educator. He served as the head football at Delaware College–now known as the University of Delaware–in 1902 and 1906, compiling a record of 8–7–1 in two seasons. Short was also assistant professor of mathematics and civil engineering during his time at Delaware College. He was serving as president of Wesley Collegiate Institute in 1926.

Short died on March 23, 1947, as his home in Lewes, Delaware.

Head coaching record

References

External links
 

1873 births
1947 deaths
Delaware Fightin' Blue Hens football coaches
Heads of universities and colleges in the United States
University of Delaware faculty
People from Georgetown, Delaware
Coaches of American football from Delaware